The Referendum Party was a Eurosceptic, single issue party in the United Kingdom formed by Sir James Goldsmith to fight the 1997 General Election. The party stood in 547 (out of 659) constituencies. In Northern Ireland, the party did not stand, but endorsed the Ulster Unionist Party. In the 165 seats also contested by UKIP, the Referendum Party beat UKIP in all but two, Romsey and Glasgow Anniesland (the latter by just two votes).

A candidate using the same party name also contested a by election in 1999.

1997 general election

Summary of results:
Votes received: 810,860
% of total votes: 2.6%
Vote as % of electorate: 1.8%
Vote as % in seats contested: 3.1%
Lost deposits: 505 at a cost of £252,500

Source:

By-election: 25 November 1999

References

1997 United Kingdom general election
Election results by party in the United Kingdom
Defunct political parties in the United Kingdom
Eurosceptic parties in the United Kingdom
Political parties established in 1994
Political parties disestablished in 1997